The Bío Bío Canal (Canal del Bío Bío) is one of the largest irrigation canals in Chile. It is located in Bío Bío Province and takes water from Bío Bío river south to the area of Mulchén for use in agriculture.

Buildings and structures in Biobío Region
Canals in Chile
Irrigation canals
Irrigation in Chile